Dujail (alternate spelling: Ad Dujayl) is a town in Saladin Governorate, Iraq. It was the site of the 1982 Dujail Massacre, in which between 142 and 148 people, including children, died. The 2008 Dujail bombing also took place here, and many bombings during the separate years and withstood during the terrorist attack of ISIS. It is famous for its palms and grapes, and it is considered a beautiful agricultural land.

The first and second witnesses who testified against Saddam Hussein, who was executed because of the Dujail massacre and many other crimes, were from Dujail.

References 

 
Populated places in Saladin Governorate